Joel Sternfeld (born June 30, 1944) is an American fine-art color photographer. He is noted for his large-format documentary pictures of the United States and helping establish color photography as a respected artistic medium.

Sternfeld's work is held in the collection of the Museum of Modern Art in New York.

Life and work
Sternfeld earned a BA from Dartmouth College and teaches photography at Sarah Lawrence College in New York. He began taking color photographs in 1970 after learning the color theory of Johannes Itten and Josef Albers. Color is an important element of his photographs.

American Prospects (1987) is Sternfeld's most known book and explores the irony of human-altered landscapes in the United States. He began it in 1978, when color photography was still in its infancy as an art medium. Using a large-format camera, his photographs harken back to the traditions of 19th century photography, yet are applied to everyday scenes, like a Wet n' Wild waterpark, or a suburban street in the South. He captured America losing its way from the Carter through the Reagan era, the faltering "prospects" (both views and opportunities) of the time.

On This Site: Landscape in Memoriam (1997), is about violence in America. Sternfeld photographed sites of recent tragedies. Next to each photograph is text about the events that happened at that location.

From 1991 to 1994 Sternfeld worked with Melinda Hunt to document New York City's public cemetery on Hart Island, resulting in the book "Hart Island" (1998).

Sternfeld has also published books about social class and stereotypes in America (Stranger Passing (2001)), an abandoned elevated railway in New York (Walking the High Line (2002)), and Sweet Earth: Experimental Utopias in America (2006).

When It Changed (2007) contains close-up portraits of delegates debating global warming at the 2005 United Nations Climate Change Conference in Montreal.

Exhibitions
 1977: Rencontres d'Arles, Arles, France.
 2011: Joel Sternfeld – Farbfotografien seit 1970, Museum Folkwang, Essen, Germany.
 2011–2012: Joel Sternfeld – Color Photographs since 1970, Foam Fotografiemuseum Amsterdam, Netherlands.
 2012: Joel Sternfeld – Farbfotografien seit 1970, Albertina, Wien, Austria.

Awards
1978–1982: Guggenheim Fellowship.
1985: Higashikawa Prize, Japan.
1980: National Endowment for the Arts Fellowship.
1990–91: Prix de Rome.
2004: Citigroup Photography Prize, in association with The Photographers' Gallery, London.
2013: Montgomery Fellowship, Dartmouth College.
2017: Honorary Fellowship of the Royal Photographic Society, Bath, UK.

Publications
Campagna Romana: The Countryside of Ancient Rome. New York, NY: Alfred A. Knopf, 1992. .
Hart Island. Zurich, Berlin, New York: Scalo, 1998. . Includes a text by Melinda Hunt.
Treading on Kings. Göttingen: Steidl, 2003. .
When It Changed. Göttingen: Steidl, 2008. .
Sweet Earth-Experimental Utopias in America. Göttingen: Steidl, 2008. .
Oxbow Archive. Göttingen: Steidl, 2008. .
iDubai. Göttingen: Steidl, 2010. .
First Pictures. Göttingen: Steidl, 2011. .
Walking the High Line. Göttingen: Steidl, 2012. .
On This Site: Landscape in Memorian. Göttingen: Steidl, 2012. .
Stranger Passing. Göttingen: Steidl, 2012. .
American Prospects. New York, NY: Distributed Art Publishers / Göttingen: Steidl, 2012. .
Rome After Rome. Göttingen: Steidl, 2018. 
Landscape as Longing: Queens, New York. Göttingen: Steidl, 2017. .
Our Loss. Göttingen: Steidl, 2019. .

Collections
Sternfeld's work is held in the following public collection:
Museum of Modern Art, New York: 61 works (as of June 2019)

References

External links
 Joel Sternfeld's website
 Steidl Artist Page: Joel Sternfeld
 Steidl site on When It Changed
 Forbes article on Sternfeld's best-known photographs
 "The High Line" photographs by Sternfeld published in Cabinet Magazine
 Story behind 'Canyon Country, California, June 1983'
 'Yochelson, Bonnie “The United Nations of Queens.” The New York Times.'
 'Lipton, Shana Ting “Joel Sternfeld on His Classic American Prospects - and His New Work” British Journal of Photography.'

1944 births
Living people
Sarah Lawrence College faculty
Dartmouth College alumni
Photographers from New York City
Fine art photographers
20th-century American photographers
21st-century American photographers